Perote is a ghost town in Menominee County, Wisconsin, United States. The town was marked on USGS maps as late as 1952.

References 

Geography of Menominee County, Wisconsin
Ghost towns in Wisconsin